Teenage Queen is an EP by new wave band Bow Wow Wow, released in 1982 by RCA Records. It was commissioned for advertising use by the Japanese cosmetic brand Perky Jean by Shiseido.

Sung to the music from the band's then-current single "Baby, Oh No", the title track's lyrics extolled the virtues of the Perky Jean make-up line. The track is often misidentified as "Perky Jean" due to the chorus of "Hey perky, perky jean, you make me feel like a teenage queen". 

When Cherry Red Records reissued See Jungle! See Jungle! Go Join Your Gang Yeah, City All Over! Go Ape Crazy! in 2010 as a 2-CD set, entitled See Jungle! See Jungle! Go Join Your Gang/B-Sides, all 5 tracks from Teenage Queen were included on the second disc. On 25 May 2018, Cherry Red released the three-disc set Your Box Set Pet (The Complete Recordings 1980–1984), which included Teenage Queen in its entirety on the third disc.

The record Teenage Queen is not related to a widely-ported early strip poker computer game from 1988.''

Track listing

References 

1982 EPs
Bow Wow Wow albums
RCA Records EPs